is a Paralympic swimmer from Japan competing mainly in category S12 events.

Kosei swam in six events at the 2004 Summer Paralympics as part of the Japanese team.  He won a bronze medal as part of the Japanese squad in the  freestyle and also finished fourth in the  medley.  Individually he competed in the 50m,100m and 400m freestyle missing the final in all three but did finish sixth in the 100m butterfly final.

References

External links
 

Paralympic swimmers of Japan
Swimmers at the 2004 Summer Paralympics
Paralympic bronze medalists for Japan
Japanese male butterfly swimmers
Japanese male freestyle swimmers
Living people
Medalists at the 2004 Summer Paralympics
Year of birth missing (living people)
Paralympic medalists in swimming
S12-classified Paralympic swimmers
21st-century Japanese people